2025 in sports describes the year's events in world sports.

Calendar by month

January

February

March

May

June

July

September

October

November

Air sports

Alpine Skiing

American football

International Federation of American Football
 TBA: 2025 IFAF World Championship (location TBA)

National Football League
 February 9: Super Bowl LIX in New Orleans, Louisiana

Aquatics

Archey

Association football

Athletics

Badminton

Bandy

Baseball

Basketball

National Basketball Association
February 16: 2025 NBA All-Star Game at the TBA in TBD

National Collegiate Athletic Association
March 18–April 7: 2025 NCAA Division I men's basketball tournament
March 21–April 6: 2025 NCAA Division I women's basketball tournament

Beach handball

Beach soccer

Beach tennis

Beach volleyball

Biathlon

Bowling

Bowls

Boxing

Canoeing

Cheerleading

Chess

Cricket
 ICC Men's Champions Trophy
 2023-25 ICC World Test Championship Final
 Women's Cricket World Cup

Cue sports

Darts

Dance sport

Dodgeball

Fencing

Field Hockey

Figure skating

Freestyle Skiing

Football (soccer)

Golf

Goalball

Gymnastics

Handball

2025 World Men's Handball Championship in  Croatia,  Denmark and  Norway
2025 World Women's Handball Championship in  Germany and  Netherlands

Ice Hockey

Judo

Karate

Lacrosse

Luge

Multi-sport events
TBD: 2025 Asian Indoor and Martial Arts Games in Riyadh, Saudi Arabia 
TBD: 2025 Asian Winter Games
TBD: 2025 African Cup of Nations in Guinea 
TBD: 2025 Southeast Asian Games in Thailand 
TBD: 2025 World Games in Chengdu, China 
TBD: 2025 Asian Youth Games in Tashkent, Uzbekistan 
TBD: 2025 Winter Universiade in Turin, Italy 
TBD: 2025 Summer Universiade in Rhine-Ruhr, Germany

Racquetball

Rowing

 2025 World Rowing Championships in  Shanghai
 2025 World Rowing Junior Championships in  Trakai

Rugby league
2025 Rugby League World Cup in

Swimming

Tennis

University sports
FISU - FISU World University Championships - 2025 Summer World University Games / 2025 Winter World University Games

Others
 International Day of University Sport (IDUS) 2025 IDUS 2025 20 September 2025

References

 
Sports by year